Chelodina (Chelydera) expansa, commonly known as the broad-shelled river turtle or the broad-shelled snake-necked turtle, is a pleurodiran freshwater turtle and is the largest of the long-necked turtles. The broad-shelled river turtle is one of the oldest-maturing and longest-living species of freshwater turtles in existence and occurs in wide sympatry with Emydura macquarii and Chelodina longicollis. C. expansa is listed as ‘vulnerable’ in South Australia and ‘threatened’ in Victoria.

Distribution and habitat 

Broad-shelled river turtles are found throughout the Murray-Darling basin of southeastern Australia. A number of distinct populations are also found across areas of central and coastal Queensland.

C. expansa is mostly found in turbid waters of depths greater than three metres. The broad-shelled river turtle will tend to inhabit environments that are undisturbed and have moderate vegetation cover for nest construction. The turtle has shown a preference of aquatic habitats in structured environments, where submerged logs, root systems and dead trees occur. Factors such as shelter from predators and food availability may influence the habitat preference of C. expansa. Seasonal changes including water level and flow may also influence the selected the habitat.

Description 

The broad-shelled river turtle has a broad, oval and flattened shell with a length of around 50 cm. The carapace length is often greater in females than males.  The turtle has a rich brown to blackish-brown carapace above, typically displaying fine dark flecks or reticulations, and a whitish or cream-colored belly. The plastron is narrow and the shell does not display any noticeable expansion anteriorly. The shell is usually twice as long as wide and is broadest at the level of the bridge. The head is broad and highly depressed and the eyes are directly dorsolateral. When extended, the neck may be longer than the carapace.

Behaviour 

The broad-shelled river turtle is mostly active from Austral spring season (October) through to early autumn (April). The species tends to decrease in movement and feeding over the cooler winter months. C. expansa is described to also show head bobbing and self-grooming actions.<ref name="Legler 1978"

Chelodina expansa spends most of its time in water. During periods when water levels are low, C. expansa will traverse over land to find other water sources. The turtle may also bury itself into mud and enter extended periods of aestivation until rain occurs and water levels increase.

Reproduction 

C. expansa usually nests during Austral autumn or in early winter when soils decrease in temperature. It will also sometimes nest during spring. Although the female broad-shelled river turtle will travel up to one kilometre away from the bank to lay her eggs, it is more common for them to nest within 100 m of the water's edge. Along the Murray River, nests are often constructed at the top of sandy ridges. In Autumn nestings, temperatures in the nest will initially decrease and then remain low during the winter period before slowly increasing during spring to reach a maximum temperature during summer.

The female turtle constructs a nest by excavating a nesting chamber with her hind legs to a depth of around 20 cm. She then deposits between 5 and 28 eggs before backfilling the nest with soil. The broad-shelled river turtle has shown a ‘body-slamming’ type behaviour when compacting nests.  This behaviour results in the formation of a hardened 'plug' which helps to seal the nest. These turtles will nest any time of the day or night with nesting being initiated by rain. Turtles tend to select nest sites that have higher sun coverage. The selection of nest sites is often a long way from the waters edge and this is seen as a behavioural strategy to minimise the risk of nest flooding. 

Hatchlings are exposed to a number of challenges. Incubation is exceptionally long due to inherently slow embryonic development, averaging between 324 and 360 days. Development is also delayed when the embryo enters two distinct periods of diapause. The primary diapause occurs inside the female before the eggs are laid. This form of diapause is known as pre-ovipositional embryonic arrest and is found in all turtles. The secondary diapause is triggered by a drop in nest temperature and occurs after embryonic growth has resumed within the nest. The young will generally hatch during spring. Asynchronous hatching is most likely maladaptive in the natural environment. Upon hatching, the young remain in the egg chamber awaiting heavy rain to trigger their release. The soil surrounding the nest, which becomes compacted and relatively hard during the long incubation, is softened by the rains and allows the hatchlings to dig their way out through the softened soil.

Diet 

The broad-shelled river turtle is highly specialized and entirely carnivorous. C. expansa primarily preys upon frogs, crustaceans, aquatic insects, and small fish.

Predators 

The introduced red fox (Vulpes vulpes) and ravens (Corvus spp.) are the major threats to the nests of the broad-shelled river turtle. Predation of nests by foxes along the Murray River is in excess of 93% which means there is little recruitment of young turtles into an ageing population. As turtles are long-lived animals and adults are still commonly seen in the wild, this can lead people to falsely believe that the population is still healthy. Other nest predators include monitor lizards, ibis and feral pigs. Predation of nests is the main challenge for C. expansa, however it is thought that the turtle becomes aware of predators, mostly from olfactory and visual signs. Hatchlings face a variety of predators while they travel overland to water; these can include birds and lizards in addition to feral foxes and feral cats. Many young turtles also die from dehydration if they fail to reach the water in time, and some are killed whilst trying to cross roads. Once they reach the water, they may be eaten by fish and other aquatic predators. In the fragmented Queensland populations, the main predator of hatchlings is the spotted barramundi.

Threats 

The broad-shelled river turtle may be infected with adults of the parasitic flatworms D. pearsoni and D. megapharynx. These flukes appear to be host-specific and live in the intestines of C. expansa.

Gallery 
For photographs and distribution maps of Chelodina expansa please see: https://commons.wikimedia.org/wiki/Category:Chelodina_expansa.

References

External links
 Broad-shelled turtle nesting chamber on Youtube
 Broad-shelled turtle on Youtube
 captive Broad-shelled turtle on Youtube

Chelydera
Reptiles described in 1857
Taxa named by John Edward Gray